Praprotno is a small settlement in the Municipality of Škofja Loka in the Upper Carniola region of Slovenia.

Name
Praprotno was attested in historical sources in German as Varngried in 1291 and Varengriet in 1414, and in Slovene as Praprotsch in 1476. Like the older German names (cf. Farn 'fern'), the name Praprotno is derived from the Slovene word praprot 'fern' and, like similar names (e.g., Praproče, Parpreče, Praprotno Brdo, and Paprače = ), it originally referred to the local vegetation.

References

External links

Praprotno at Geopedia

Populated places in the Municipality of Škofja Loka